Show 'Em How is the sixth album by American doom metal band Pentagram. It was released in 2004 by Italian label Black Widow Records. This album featured Bobby Liebling on vocals backed up by three members of Internal Void. The spine reads "Further infections to feed your disease".

Track listing
(Songwriters listed in brackets.)
 "Wheel of Fortune" (Liebling/O'Keefe) – 3:47
 "Elektra Glide" (Carmichael/Liebling) – 3:30
 "Starlady" (Liebling/Palmer) – 5:23
 "Catwalk" (Liebling) – 3:48
 "Prayer for an Exit Before the Dead End" (Carmichael/Liebling) – 5:50
 "Goddess" (Liebling) – 3:07
 "City Romance" (Carmichael/Liebling) – 4:36
 "If the Winds Would Change" (Liebling) – 4:42
 "Show 'em How" (Liebling) – 5:06
 "Last Days Here" (O'Keefe/Liebling) – 5:11

Lineup 
Bobby Liebling – all lead and backing vocals
Kelly Carmichael – guitar
Adam Heinzmann – bass
Mike Smail – drums

2004 albums
Pentagram (band) albums
Black Widow Records albums